The Warwick (Electoral Changes) Order 2014 is a statutory instrument of the Parliament of the United Kingdom. The order abolished the existing wards in the district of Warwick.

Provisions
The provisions of the order include:
Abolishing the existing wards in the district of Warwick.
Establishing 22 new district wards and designating each as electing a certain amount of councillors:
Abbey ward – 3 councillors
Arden ward – 2 councillors
Aylesford ward – 2 councillors
Bishop's Tachbrook ward – 1 councillor
Brunswick ward – 2 councillors
Budbrooke ward – 2 councillors
Clarendon ward – 2 councillors
Crown ward – 2 councillors
Emscote ward – 2 councillors
Leam ward – 2 councillors
Manor ward – 2 councillors
Milverton ward – 2 councillors
Myton & Heathcote ward – 2 councillors
Newbold ward – 2 councillors
Park Hill ward – 3 councillors
Radford Semele ward – 1 councillor
Saltisford ward – 2 councillors
St John's ward – 3 councillors
Stoneleigh & Cubbington – 2 councillors
Sydenham ward – 2 councillors
Whitnash ward – 3 councillors
Woodloes ward – 2 councillors
Abolishing the existing wards of the parishes of Cubbington, Kenilworth, Royal Leamington Spa, Warwick and Witnash.

See also

List of Statutory Instruments of the United Kingdom, 2014

References

Election law in the United Kingdom
Law of the United Kingdom
2014 in British law
Warwick District
Statutory Instruments of the United Kingdom